Jennie Macandrew (6 September 1866–24 December 1949) was a New Zealand pianist, organist, music teacher and conductor. She was born in Dunedin, New Zealand on 6 September 1866. Her parents were George Richard West and Mary Elizabeth Newman

References

1866 births
1949 deaths
New Zealand pianists
New Zealand women pianists
New Zealand music teachers
Musicians from Dunedin
New Zealand classical organists
Women organists
Women music educators
Women classical pianists